José Pedraza Zúñiga, nicknamed "El Sargento Pedraza" (September 19, 1937 – June 1, 1998) was a Mexican race walker and an army sergeant. He was the first Mexican athlete to win an Olympic medal in track and field.  Since Pedraza, Mexico has won 9 additional Olympic medals in race walking alone. He was born in La Mojonera, Michoacán de Ocampo and died in Mexico City, Distrito Federal.

Achievements

References

1937 births
1998 deaths
Mexican male racewalkers
Sportspeople from Michoacán
Athletes (track and field) at the 1967 Pan American Games
Athletes (track and field) at the 1968 Summer Olympics
Olympic athletes of Mexico
Olympic silver medalists for Mexico
Pan American Games silver medalists for Mexico
Pan American Games medalists in athletics (track and field)
Olympic silver medalists in athletics (track and field)
Central American and Caribbean Games gold medalists for Mexico
Competitors at the 1966 Central American and Caribbean Games
Medalists at the 1968 Summer Olympics
Central American and Caribbean Games medalists in athletics
Medalists at the 1967 Pan American Games
20th-century Mexican people